The Novavax COVID-19 vaccine, sold under the brand names Nuvaxovid and Covovax, among others, is a subunit COVID-19 vaccine developed by Novavax and the Coalition for Epidemic Preparedness Innovations (CEPI). Full results from Nuvaxovid's pivotal phase III trial were published in December 2021.

Medical uses 
The Novavax COVID19 vaccine is indicated for active immunization to prevent COVID19 caused by SARS-CoV-2.

Efficacy 
A vaccine is generally considered effective if the estimate is ≥50% with a >30% lower limit of the 95% confidence interval. Efficacy is closely related to effectiveness, which is generally expected to slowly decrease over time.

In December 2021, Novavax reported that its phase III trial showed the vaccine achieved its primary endpoint of preventing infection at least seven days after the second dose. Overall efficacy against different SARS-CoV-2s was 90.4% and efficacy against moderate-to-severe disease was 100%.
Trials were conducted before the emergence of the SARS-CoV-2 Omicron variant, which has sharply reduced the effectiveness of authorized vaccines in preventing infections.

Side effects
The most common side effects include fever, headache, nausea, muscle and joint pain, tenderness and pain at the injection site, tiredness, and feeling unwell.

Additional possible side effects include anaphylaxis (severe allergic reaction), paresthesia (unusual feeling in the skin, such as tingling or a crawling sensation) and hypoesthesia (decreased feeling or sensitivity, especially in the skin), and pericarditis (inflammation of lining around the heart).

On 27 January 2023, Australia's Therapeutic Goods Administration indicated it will add tinnitus to its label.

Handling and administration
The vaccine requires two doses and is stable at  refrigerated temperatures.

Technology 
NVX-CoV2373 has been described as both a protein subunit vaccine and a virus-like particle vaccine, though the producers call it a "recombinant nanoparticle vaccine".

The vaccine is produced by creating an engineered baculovirus containing a gene for a modified SARS-CoV-2 spike protein. The spike protein was modified by incorporating two proline amino acids in order to stabilize the pre-fusion form of the protein; this same 2P modification is being used in several other COVID19 vaccines. The baculovirus is made to infect a culture of Sf9 moth cells, which then create the spike protein and display it on their cell membranes. The spike proteins are harvested and assembled onto a synthetic lipid nanoparticle about 50 nanometers across, each displaying up to 14 spike proteins.

The formulation includes a saponin-based adjuvant named Matrix-M.

Manufacturing 
On 24 February 2021, Novavax partnered with Takeda to manufacture the vaccine in Japan, where its COVID19 vaccine candidate is known as TAK-019.

Novavax signed an agreement with Serum Institute of India for mass scale production for developing and low-income countries. In 2020 it was reported, that the vaccine would be manufactured in Spain and in November 2021 it was reported to be produced in Poland by the Mabion company. As of 2021, antigens were made at Novavax’s factory Novavax CZ in the Czech Republic; Novavax CZ was also marketing authorisation holder of its EU authorization.

In May 2021, Serum Institute of India said that it started the production of the Novavax COVID19 vaccine candidate branded as Covovax in India after receiving permission from the Indian government.

History 
In January 2020, Novavax announced development of a vaccine candidate, codenamed NVX-CoV2373, to establish immunity to SARS-CoV-2. Novavax's work is in competition for vaccine development among dozens of other companies.

In March 2020, Novavax announced a collaboration with Emergent BioSolutions for preclinical and early-stage human research on the vaccine candidate. Under the partnership, Emergent BioSolutions was supposed to manufacture the vaccine at large scale at their Baltimore facility. However, following production issues with the Johnson & Johnson and Oxford–AstraZeneca vaccines at its Baltimore plant and to decrease the burden on the plant, Novavax subsequently partnered with a different manufacturer in a new agreement overseen by the U.S. government.

Trials have also taken place in the United Kingdom. The first human safety studies of the candidate, codenamed NVX-CoV2373, started in May 2020 in Australia.

In July 2020, the company announced it might receive  from Operation Warp Speed to expedite development of its coronavirus vaccine candidate by 2021if clinical trials show the vaccine to be effective. A spokesperson for Novavax stated that the $1.6 billion was coming from a "collaboration" between the Department of Health and Human Services and Department of Defense, where General Gustave F. Perna has been selected as COO for Warp Speed. In late September, Novavax entered the final stages of testing its coronavirus vaccine in the UK. Another large trial was announced to start by October in the US.

Clinical trials

Phase I and II
On 26 May 2020, Australia's first human trials of a candidate COVID19 vaccine, Novavax's NVX-CoV2373, began in Melbourne. It involved about 130 volunteers aged between 18-59.

Phase III 
On 24 September 2020, Novavax started for a phase III trial with 15,000 in the UK.

In December 2020 Novavax started the PREVENT-19 (NCT04611802) phase III trial in the US and Mexico, funded by NIAID and BARDA.

On 3 May 2021, Novavax initiated a pediatric expansion for the phase III clinical trial, with 3,000 adolescents 12–17 years of age in up to 75 sites in the United States.

UK trial 
On 28 January 2021, Novavax reported that preliminary results from the United Kingdom trial showed that its vaccine candidate was more than 89% effective. 

On 12 March 2021, Novavax announced their vaccine candidate was 96.4% effective in preventing the original strain of COVID-19 and 86% effective against the Alpha variant.

On 30 June 2021, a primary Novavax-funded study published in The New England Journal of Medicine, showed that the vaccine has an overall efficacy of 83.4% two weeks after the first dose and 89.7% one week after the second dose. A post hoc analysis showed an efficacy of 86.3% against the B.1.1.7 (Alpha) variant and 96.4% against "non-B.1.1.7 strains", the majority of which were the "prototype strains" (original strain).

South Africa trial 
On 28 January 2021, Novavax reported that interim results from a trial in South Africa showed a lower effectiveness rate against the Beta variant (lineage B.1.351), at around 50–60%.

In a study reported in March and May 2021, the efficacy of the Novavax vaccine (NVX-CoV2373) was tested in a preliminary randomized, placebo-controlled study involving 2684  participants who were negative for COVID at baseline testing.  The Beta variant was the predominant variant to occur, with post-hoc analysis indicating a cross-protective vaccine efficacy of Novavax against Beta of 51.0% for  HIV-negative participants.

US and Mexico trial 
On 14 June 2021, Novavax announced overall 90.4% efficacy in the Phase III U.S. & Mexico trial that involved nearly 30,000 people aged 18 years of age and older. From the total 77 COVID-19 cases found in the trial participants, 14 occurred in the vaccine group, while 63 occurred in the placebo group.

Society and culture 
About 216,000 doses of the Novavax COVID-19 vaccine were administered in the EU/EEA from authorization to 26 June 2022.

Legal status 

In February 2021, the European Medicines Agency (EMA) started a rolling review of the Novavax COVID-19 vaccine (NVX‑CoV2373). In November 2021, the EMA received application for conditional marketing authorization. On 20 December 2021, the European Commission granted a conditional marketing authorization across the EU, following a recommendation from the European Medicines Agency (EMA), for it to be sold under the brand name Nuvaxovid.

As of November 2021, it has been authorized for use in Indonesia, the Philippines, as of December in India, as of January 2022 in South Korea, Australia, as of February 2022 in the United Kingdom, Canada, Taiwan, and Singapore. As of December 2021 it was validated by the World Health Organization.

On 3 June 2022, the FDA's advisory committee voted 21-0 with one abstention to recommend authorization of Novavax's vaccine for use in adults in the United States. 
On 13 July 2022, the FDA authorized NVX-CoV2373 for emergency use as a primary immunization (not booster) in adults. making it the fourth COVID19 vaccine authorized in the US. On 19 July 2022, the US Centers for Disease Control and Prevention (CDC) recommended the Novavax COVID19 vaccine as a two-dose primary series for adults age 18 and older, thus endorsing the recommendation from the Advisory Committee on Immunization Practices (ACIP) regarding this vaccine. On 19 August 2022, the FDA granted Emergency Use Authorization for the Novavax COVID19 vaccine in people aged 12-17 years. On 22 August 2022, the CDC recommended the Novavax COVID19 vaccine for adolescents aged 12-17 years.

Notes

References

Further reading

External links 

American COVID-19 vaccines
Clinical trials
Subunit vaccines